The Gregory Dipping Vat is a historic cattle dipping facility at 122 Rogers Street on the outskirts of Lake Village, Arkansas. It is located on a grassy lane off Rogers Road, in a wooded area not far from Bayou Macon, whose waters were used to fill it. The vat was built c. 1930 as part of a statewide program to eradicate Texas tick fever, which was at the time a serious problem affecting the area's cattle farmers. After the program was ended in 1943, the vat became a play area for local youth. It remains in good condition as a reminder of the economically important tick eradication program.

The vat was listed on the National Register of Historic Places in 2006.

See also
National Register of Historic Places listings in Chicot County, Arkansas

References

Agricultural buildings and structures on the National Register of Historic Places in Arkansas
Buildings and structures completed in 1930
National Register of Historic Places in Chicot County, Arkansas
Lake Village, Arkansas
1930 establishments in Arkansas
Plunge dips